Jeff R. Sanchez (born May 11, 1962) is a former American football defensive back who played college football at the University of Georgia. He was drafted by the Pittsburgh Steelers in the twelfth round of the 1985 NFL Draft and waived by the Steelers in August 1985. He was a consensus All-American in 1984.

References

External links
Fanbase profile

Living people
1962 births
American football defensive backs
African-American players of American football
Georgia Bulldogs football players
All-American college football players
21st-century African-American people
20th-century African-American sportspeople